Ben Gulliver (born 16 March 1981 in Coventry) is a Rugby Union player, who currently plays for Ampthill in National League 1. 
His preferred position is Lock. His stature makes him a big threat at line-outs.
Began his career at Coventry and following a brief spell at Saracens (where he represented England Students), Gulliver made the move to the Westcountry to join Plymouth Albion. He impressed there until a broken leg led to a lengthy spell on the sidelines. In summer 2008, Ben moved across the Tamar to local rivals Cornish Pirates. After impressing in 30 appearances in his first campaign, his second season (2009/10) was beset by injury but ultimately successful as Ben contributed to Cornish Pirates' victory in the inaugural British and Irish Cup.

In September, Cornish Pirates announced they had agreed to a three-month loan deal for Ben to go to Leicester Tigers as temporary cover for injured England international locks Geoff Parling and Louis Deacon.

At the end of the 2011-2012 season, Ben left Worcester Warriors after one season and went to Bedford Blues.

References

1981 births
Living people
Bedford Blues players
Cornish Pirates players
English rugby union players
Leicester Tigers players
Plymouth Albion R.F.C. players
Rugby union players from Coventry
Worcester Warriors players
Rugby union locks